Boris Becker defeated Ivan Lendl in the final, 7–6(7–2), 1–6, 6–3, 7–6(7–4) to win the men's singles tennis title at the 1989 US Open. Becker saved a match point en route to the title, against Derrick Rostagno in the second round. This was Lendl's eighth consecutive singles final appearance at the US Open; he became the first man in the Open Era to finish runner-up five times at the same major.

Mats Wilander was the defending champion, but lost in the second round to 18-year-old and future world No. 1 Pete Sampras.

Seeds
The seeded players are listed below. Boris Becker is the champion; others show the round in which they were eliminated.

  Ivan Lendl (finalist)
  Boris Becker (champion)
  Stefan Edberg (fourth round)
  John McEnroe (second round)
  Mats Wilander (second round)
  Andre Agassi (semifinalist)
  Michael Chang (fourth round)
  Brad Gilbert (first round)
  Tim Mayotte (quarterfinalist)
  Alberto Mancini (fourth round)
  Jay Berger (quarterfinalist)
  Emilio Sánchez (third round)
  Jimmy Connors (quarterfinalist)
  Aaron Krickstein (semifinalist)
  Carl-Uwe Steeb (third round)
  Andrei Chesnokov (fourth round)

Draw

Finals

Top half

Section 1

Section 2

Section 3

Section 4

Bottom half

Section 5

Section 6

Section 7

Section 8

Matches

Final
 September 10, 1989 – Boris Becker becomes the first German man to win the U.S. Open, defeating Ivan Lendl in the final. Lendl appears in his eighth straight U.S. Open final, which ties him with Bill Tilden for the all-time record.

Semifinals

Quarterfinals
 Agassi-Connors
Played on Stadium Court, National Tennis Center, Flushing Meadows, New York. Originally shown by USA Network with play by play commentators: Ted Robinson and Vitas Gerulaitis

 19yr old Andre Agassi with long flowing hair and jean shorts wearing a Nike shirt playing with a Donnay racquet, being Coached by Nick Bollettieri.
 37yr old Jimmy Connors with a white bandana around his neck wearing a Slazenger "Triangle" shirt playing with a Slazenger racquet.
After a solid opening set, Agassi loses the next two, with Connors winning the third 6–0. Agassi then has to save three break points to win the fourth set to tie the match. The fifth starts in Agassi's favor, breaking twice and jumping to a 5–1 lead, but Connors rallies back with a break to 5–4. Finally, with double match point, Agassi misses a backhand down the line, but then pulls off a backhand dropshot which Connors hits long.

Early rounds
 Down match point in his 2nd round match, Boris Becker benefits from a net-cord passing shot just out of the reach of Derrick Rostagno in his come-from-behind victory. Also on the stadium, qualifier Paul Haarhuis stuns number four seed John McEnroe in one of the biggest upsets in U.S. Open history. In the next match on the stadium court, 18-year old Pete Sampras upsets defending champion and number five seed Mats Wilander.

References

External links
 Association of Tennis Professionals (ATP) – 1989 US Open Men's Singles draw
1989 US Open – Men's draws and results at the International Tennis Federation

Men's singles
US Open (tennis) by year – Men's singles